Jan-Magnus Jansson (24 January 1922 – 29 November 2003) was a Finnish politician, a member of the Swedish People's Party.

Jansson studied at Svenska normallyceum i Helsingfors and then at the University of Helsinki. Jansson was a Professor of Political Science at the University of Helsinki 1954–74 and chancellor for the Åbo Akademi University 1985 to 1991. He was the chairman of the Swedish People's Party (SPP) from 1966 to 1973 and a minister of trade and industry in Kalevi Sorsa's first government (1 January 1973 - 30 September 1974). Jansson was his party's presidential candidate in the 1982 elections and received 11 electoral votes.

Jansson was also the editor-in-chief of Hufvudstadsbladet from 1974 to 1987.

Jansson wrote several books, for instance about the Finnish Constitution, and some poetry works.

In the 1990s, he was against the Finland's membership of European Union which actively threatened the neutrality of Finland's foreign policy.

He is buried in the Hietaniemi Cemetery in Helsinki.

References

1922 births
2003 deaths
Politicians from Helsinki
Swedish-speaking Finns
Swedish People's Party of Finland politicians
Ministers of Trade and Industry of Finland
Academic staff of the University of Helsinki
Burials at Hietaniemi Cemetery
20th-century Finnish journalists